Acestrorhynchus abbreviatus is a species of fish in the family Acestrorhynchidae. It was described by Edward Drinker Cope in 1878, originally under the genus Xiphorhamphus. It inhabits the Amazon and Madeira Rivers.

References

Acestrorhynchidae
Taxa named by Edward Drinker Cope
Fish described in 1878